The 2010 AFL Tasmania TSL premiership season was an Australian Rules Football competition staged across Tasmania, Australian over eighteen roster rounds and nine finals series matches between 2 April and 18 September 2010.
The League was known as the Wrest Point Tasmanian State League under a commercial naming-rights sponsorship agreement with Wrest Point Casino in Hobart and Federal Group.

Participating Clubs
Burnie Dockers Football Club
Clarence District Football Club
Devonport Football Club
Glenorchy District Football Club
Hobart Football Club
Lauderdale Football Club
Launceston Football Club
North Hobart Football Club
North Launceston Football Club
South Launceston Football Club

2010 TSL Club Coaches
Brent Plant (Burnie)
Brett Geappen (Clarence)
Errol Bourne (Devonport)
Ben Reid (Glenorchy)
Graham Fox (Hobart)
Darren Winter (Lauderdale)
Anthony Taylor (Launceston)
Clinton Brown (North Hobart)
Paul Atkins (North Launceston)
Dale Chugg (South Launceston)

Leading Goalkickers: Tasmanian State League
Brian Finch (Launceston) – 94
Darren Crawford (Nth Launceston) – 66
Trent Standen (Clarence) – 66
Brett Geappen (Clarence) – 62
Paul Allison (Nth Hobart) – 46

Medal Winners
Brett Geappen (Clarence) – Tassie Medal
Cameron Thurley (Clarence) – Darrel Baldock Medal (Best player in TSL Grand Final)
Brett Geappen (Clarence) – Cazaly Medal (TSL Premiership coach)
Brian Finch (Launceston) – Hudson Medal (TSL Leading goalkicker)
Patrick Riley (North Hobart) – Eade Medal (TSL Colts)

Wrest Point TSL Under-19's Grand Final
Nth Launceston 10.11 (71) v Clarence 7.8 (50) – Bellerive Oval

Statewide Reserves Grand Final
Clarence 8.8 (56) v Nth Hobart 7.11 (53) – Bellerive Oval

Interstate Matches
Representative Match (Saturday, 12 June 2010)
Queensland 23.26 (164) v Tasmania 13.7 (85) – Fankhauser Reserve, Gold Coast

2010 Tasmanian State League Ladder

Round 1
(Friday, 2 April. Saturday, 3 April & Monday, 5 April 2010)
Nth Hobart 15.16 (106) v Hobart 7.8 (50) – TCA Ground (Friday)
Launceston 15.11 (101) v Nth Launceston 8.9 (57) – Windsor Park (Friday)
Burnie 9.10 (64) v Devonport 9.7 (61) – Devonport Oval (Friday Night)
Sth Launceston 13.8 (86) v Lauderdale 12.10 (82) – North Hobart Oval (Saturday)
Clarence 18.14 (122) v Glenorchy 11.8 (74) – Bellerive Oval (Monday Night)

Round 2
(Saturday, 10 April & Sunday, 11 April 2010)
Nth Hobart 18.15 (123) v Lauderdale 6.13 (49) – North Hobart Oval
Clarence 20.15 (135) v Sth Launceston 8.9 (57) – Youngtown Memorial Ground
Burnie 16.17 (113) v Launceston 13.5 (83) – West Park Oval
Nth Launceston 11.10 (76) v Devonport 8.14 (62) – Aurora Stadium (Night)
Glenorchy 20.6 (126) v Hobart 12.11 (83) – KGV Football Park (Sunday)

Round 3
(Saturday, 17 April 2010)
Clarence 22.21 (153) v Hobart 9.11 (65) – TCA Ground
Launceston 18.10 (118) v Sth Launceston 9.7 (61) – Windsor Park
Lauderdale 12.18 (90) v Glenorchy 13.7 (85) – KGV Football Park
Nth Launceston 12.11 (83) v Burnie 6.11 (47) – Aurora Stadium (Night)
Nth Hobart 18.14 (122) v Devonport 12.7 (79) – Devonport Oval (Night)

Round 4
(Saturday, 24 April 2010)
Hobart 14.14 (98) v Lauderdale 13.8 (86) – Lauderdale Sports Ground
Devonport 7.18 (60) v Launceston 6.7 (43) – Windsor Park
Nth Launceston 11.11 (77) v Sth Launceston 10.9 (69) – Youngtown Memorial Ground
Glenorchy 16.13 (109) v Burnie 13.11 (89) – West Park Oval
Clarence 13.14 (92) v Nth Hobart 9.21 (75) – Bellerive Oval (Night)

Round 5
(Friday, 30 April & Saturday, 1 May 2010)
Clarence 18.14 (122) v Lauderdale 4.3 (27) – Bellerive Oval (Friday Night)
Nth Launceston 14.9 (93) v Glenorchy 9.10 (64) – KGV Football Park
Hobart 20.16 (136) v Burnie 8.7 (55) – TCA Ground
Nth Hobart 11.16 (82) v Launceston 9.12 (66) – North Hobart Oval
Devonport 14.14 (98) v Sth Launceston 9.5 (59) – Devonport Oval (Night)

Round 6
(Saturday, 8 May & Sunday, 9 May 2010)
Devonport 16.12 (108) v Hobart 8.10 (58) – TCA Ground
Clarence 21.11 (137) v Launceston 10.10 (70) – Windsor Park
Nth Launceston 17.16 (118) v Lauderdale 8.10 (58) – Aurora Stadium
Sth Launceston 14.8 (92) v Burnie 13.13 (91) – West Park Oval
Glenorchy 15.17 (107) v Nth Hobart 14.10 (94) – North Hobart Oval (Sunday)

Round 7
(Saturday, 15 May & Sunday, 16 May 2010)
Clarence 17.17 (119) v Burnie 3.9 (27) – Bellerive Oval
Nth Hobart 19.15 (129) v Lauderdale 8.12 (60) – Lauderdale Sports Ground
Hobart 23.11 (149) v Sth Launceston 8.11 (59) – Youngtown Memorial Ground
Launceston 19.13 (127) v Glenorchy 11.13 (79) – KGV Football Park
Devonport 14.13 (97) v Nth Launceston 7.7 (49) – Aurora Stadium (Sunday)

Round 8
(Saturday, 22 May 2010)
Devonport 13.14 (92) v Lauderdale 10.3 (63) – Bellerive Oval (Double-Header)
Clarence 18.7 (115) v Glenorchy 10.13 (73) – KGV Football Park
Burnie 13.10 (88) v Nth Launceston 11.12 (78) – West Park Oval
Launceston 12.7 (79) v Sth Launceston 9.8 (62) – Aurora Stadium
Hobart 10.10 (70) v Nth Hobart 8.15 (63) – Bellerive Oval (Night)

Round 9
(Friday, 28 May & Saturday, 29 May 2010)
Nth Launceston 9.23 (77) v Sth Launceston 7.8 (50) – Aurora Stadium (Friday Night)
Clarence 22.10 (142) v Nth Hobart 9.9 (63) – North Hobart Oval
Lauderdale 10.11 (71) v Hobart 5.8 (38) – TCA Ground
Devonport 16.12 (108) v Glenorchy 9.4 (58) – Devonport Oval
Launceston 19.16 (130) v Burnie 7.6 (48) – Windsor Park

Round 10
(Saturday, 5 June 2010)
Clarence 15.19 (109) v Nth Launceston 12.11 (83) – Bellerive Oval
Glenorchy 15.9 (99) v Hobart 13.8 (86) – KGV Football Park
Nth Hobart 11.18 (84) v Burnie 9.9 (63) – West Park Oval
Launceston 19.12 (126) v Lauderdale 6.7 (43) – Aurora Stadium (Double-Header)
Devonport 8.10 (58) v Sth Launceston 5.6 (36) – Aurora Stadium (Night)

Round 11
(Saturday, 19 June 2010)
Glenorchy 15.15 (105) v Nth Hobart 13.13 (91) – North Hobart Oval
Launceston 18.10 (118) v Devonport 6.8 (44) – Devonport Oval
Clarence 12.12 (84) v Lauderdale 6.12 (48) – Lauderdale Sports Ground
Nth Launceston 15.9 (99) v Hobart 14.11 (95) – Aurora Stadium
Burnie 12.20 (92) v Sth Launceston 11.9 (75) – Youngtown Memorial Ground

Round 12
(Saturday, 26 June 2010)
Clarence 13.15 (93) v Hobart 8.11 (59) – North Hobart Oval (Double-Header)
Nth Hobart 21.23 (149) v Sth Launceston 6.5 (41) – North Hobart Oval (Double-Header)
Glenorchy 16.15 (111) v Lauderdale 7.6 (48) – KGV Football Park
Launceston 12.13 (85) v Nth Launceston 9.10 (64) – Windsor Park
Burnie 15.10 (100) v Devonport 11.19 (85) – West Park Oval

Round 13
(Saturday, 3 July & Sunday, 4 July 2010)
Clarence 18.7 (115) v Glenorchy 9.10 (64) – Bellerive Oval *
Burnie 16.12 (108) v Nth Launceston 8.8 (56) – Aurora Stadium
Devonport 15.16 (106) v Hobart 13.8 (86) – Devonport Oval
Lauderdale 11.13 (79) v Nth Hobart 7.12 (54) – Lauderdale Sports Ground (Sunday)
Launceston 20.12 (132) v Sth Launceston 4.8 (32) – Youngtown Memorial Ground (Sunday)
Note: Clarence wore their 1947-1978 maroon and white jumper for this match.

Round 14
(Saturday, 10 July 2010)
Clarence 17.13 (115) v Devonport 12.11 (83) – Bellerive Oval
Nth Hobart 18.12 (120) v Hobart 10.8 (68) – North Hobart Oval
Lauderdale 15.19 (109) v Nth Launceston 15.7 (97) – Lauderdale Sports Ground
Launceston 15.11 (101) v Burnie 12.17 (89) – West Park Oval
Glenorchy 16.15 (111) v Sth Launceston 8.12 (60) – Youngtown Memorial Ground

Round 15 (Split Round)
(Saturday, 17 July & Saturday, 24 July 2010)
Glenorchy 15.14 (104) v Burnie 12.11 (83) – KGV Football Park (17 July)
Devonport 17.11 (113) v Sth Launceston 4.13 (37) – Devonport Oval (17 July)
Lauderdale 16.8 (104) v Hobart 11.11 (77) – TCA Ground (24 July)
Launceston 15.10 (100) v Clarence 10.5 (65) – Windsor Park (24 July)
Nth Launceston 10.13 (73) v Nth Hobart 9.11 (65) – Aurora Stadium (24 July)

Round 16
(Friday, 30 July 2010 & Saturday, 31 July 2010)
Nth Launceston 9.9 (63) v Sth Launceston 6.7 (43) – Aurora Stadium (Friday Night)
Launceston 11.6 (72) v Devonport 10.8 (68) – Aurora Stadium
Clarence 16.16 (112) v Nth Hobart 13.13 (91) – Bellerive Oval
Hobart 19.14 (128) v Glenorchy 4.11 (35) – TCA Ground
Lauderdale 9.16 (70) v Burnie 3.21 (39) – West Park Oval

Round 17
(Friday, 6 August & Saturday, 7 August 2010)
Devonport 16.9 (105) v Burnie 7.10 (52) – Devonport Oval (Friday Night)
Launceston 9.16 (70) v Nth Launceston 6.6 (42) – Aurora Stadium (Friday Night)
Nth Hobart 21.14 (140) v Sth Launceston 7.7 (49) – North Hobart Oval
Glenorchy 9.10 (64) v Lauderdale 7.15 (57) – Lauderdale Sports Ground
Clarence 22.13 (145) v Hobart 10.10 (70) – Bellerive Oval

Round 18
(Saturday, 14 August 2010)
Launceston 23.8 (146) v Hobart 11.6 (72) – TCA Ground *
Glenorchy 12.20 (92) v Nth Hobart 12.8 (80) – KGV Football Park
Devonport 8.22 (70) v Nth Launceston 8.12 (60) – Devonport Oval
Clarence 19.12 (126) v Lauderdale 9.5 (59) – Lauderdale Sports Ground
Burnie 15.16 (106) v Sth Launceston 8.11 (59) – West Park Oval
Note: Both Hobart (Cananore guernseys) and Launceston wore heritage strips for this match.

First Qualifying Final
(Saturday, 21 August 2010)
Clarence: 3.6 (24) | 7.12 (54) | 8.18 (66) | 12.22 (94)
Launceston: 1.0 (6) | 3.3 (21) | 8.4 (52) | 9.8 (62)
Attendance: Not Available at Bellerive Oval

Second Qualifying Final
(Saturday, 21 August 2010)
Devonport: 4.0 (24) | 5.4 (34) | 10.8 (68) | 13.12 (90)
Glenorchy: 0.4 (4) | 4.6 (30) | 4.8 (32) | 5.10 (40)
Attendance: Not Available at Devonport Oval (Night)

First Elimination Final
(Sunday, 22 August 2010)
Nth Hobart: 1.2 (8) | 5.7 (37) | 9.9 (63) | 12.11 (83)
Nth Launceston: 5.7 (37) | 7.10 (52) | 8.13 (61) | 10.15 (75)
Attendance: Not Available at North Hobart Oval

Third Qualifying Final
(Saturday, 28 August 2010)
Launceston: 6.3 (39) | 9.4 (58) | 13.6 (84) | 20.9 (129)
Devonport: 1.4 (10) | 7.6 (48) | 8.11 (59) | 9.16 (70)
Attendance: Not Available at Aurora Stadium

Second Elimination Final
(Sunday, 29 August 2010)
Nth Hobart: 4.4 (28) | 8.7 (55) | 14.11 (95) | 21.12 (138)
Glenorchy: 2.1 (13) | 4.7 (31) | 5.11 (41) | 11.14 (80)
Attendance: Not Available at Bellerive Oval

First Semi Final
(Saturday, 4 September 2010)
Devonport: 4.1 (25) | 5.2 (32) | 5.8 (38) | 5.11 (41)
Nth Hobart: 2.1 (13) | 3.6 (24) | 3.6 (24) | 5.9 (39)
Attendance: Not Available at Devonport Oval

Second Semi Final
(Saturday, 4 September 2010)
Clarence: 3.5 (23) | 6.11 (47) | 8.13 (61) | 11.16 (82)
Launceston: 2.1 (13) | 3.1 (19) | 3.2 (20) | 5.3 (33)
Attendance: Not Available at Bellerive Oval

Preliminary Final
(Friday, 10 September 2010)
Devonport: 3.2 (20) | 6.7 (43) | 9.11 (65) | 11.14 (80)
Launceston: 3.1 (19) | 5.4 (34) | 7.9 (51) | 9.11 (65)
Attendance: 1,241 at Aurora Stadium (Night)

Grand Final
(Saturday, 18 September 2010)
Clarence: 5.3 (33) | 8.4 (52) | 9.10 (64) | 15.13 (103)
Devonport: 2.2 (14) | 5.9 (39) | 5.9 (39) | 6.10 (46)
Attendance: 6,123 at Bellerive Oval

External links
 Tasmanian State League website 
 2010 TSL Season review - Courtesy ABC1

2010
2010 in Australian rules football